The 2020 Texas Longhorns football team represented the University of Texas at Austin during the 2020 NCAA Division I FBS football season. The Longhorns played their home games at Darrell K Royal–Texas Memorial Stadium in Austin, Texas. They are a charter member of the Big 12 Conference. They were led by fourth-year head coach Tom Herman.

The Longhorns finished their season with a 5-3 conference record in Big 12 play, and 7-3 overall, having had their final regular season game against Kansas cancelled due to COVID-19 protocols. They then went on to rout the 4-1 Colorado Buffaloes in a 32-point Alamo Bowl victory to finish as the No. 19 team in the nation.

However, despite this fourth-straight bowl win, Tom Herman was fired after four years as head coach. This followed a second consecutive season that fell short of expectations and included a narrow home loss to Iowa State that eliminated Texas from Big 12 championship contention in Week 13. Initial reports had linked former Florida and Ohio State head coach Urban Meyer to Herman's hot seat job in the months prior to his firing; yet, ultimately, the post went to Alabama offensive coordinator Steve Sarkisian, who was named head coach on January 2, 2021, just hours after Herman's dismissal. Pass rusher Joseph Ossai was also named a consensus All-American.

Previous season
The Longhorns finished the 2019 season with an 8–5 record, 5–4 in Big 12 play, upsetting No. 10 Utah 38–10 in the Alamo Bowl to end their season ranked No. 25 overall.

Offseason

Coaching changes
After being demoted from his role as offensive coordinator, Tim Beck was hired by NC State as offensive coordinator. Additionally, both co-defensive coordinators, Todd Orlando and Craig Naivar, were fired, along with several other coaches. Orlando and Naivar were replaced by former Rutgers head coach Chris Ash and South Carolina linebackers coach Coleman Hutzler.

Position key

Coaching staff departures

Players drafted into the NFL

Preseason

Big 12 media days
The Big 12 media days were held on July 21–22, 2020 in a virtual format due to the COVID-19 pandemic.

Big 12 media poll

Schedule

Spring game
The Longhorns held spring practices in March and April 2020. The Texas football spring game took place in Austin, Texas on April 25, 2020.

Regular season
Texas released its 2020 schedule on October 22, 2019. The 2020 schedule consisted of 6 home games, 4 away games and 1 neutral-site game in the regular season. The Longhorns were scheduled to host 3 non-conference games, against South Florida, LSU, and UTEP. Texas was scheduled to host West Virginia, Baylor, TCU, and Iowa State, and Texas was scheduled to travel to Kansas State, Texas Tech, Kansas, and Oklahoma State in regular season conference play.

On August 12, 2020, the Longhorns' revised schedule was released. Previously scheduled games against South Florida on September 5 and LSU on September 12 were both canceled due to the COVID-19 pandemic.

On November 18, 2020, the Big 12 Conference announced that the Texas–Kansas game would be rescheduled from November 21 to December 12 because of Kansas' "inability to meet the minimum position requirements established by the Big 12 Conference." A team needs 53 players to play a game, and there are also minimum numbers of players for each position group. Due to the "ongoing surge in COVID-19 cases and hospitalizations across the region", Kansas suspended fan attendance at all home games from November 17 to November 30, although it did not make a decision whether the December 12 Texas–Kansas game would allow fan attendance.

Original

Revised

1: Due to Kansas's inability to meet minimum position requirements due to COVID-19, the game was postponed from November 21 to December 12, and was then canceled on December 10 because of a rise of COVID-19 cases in both programs.

Coaching staff

Game summaries

vs. UTEP

at Texas Tech

vs. TCU

vs. Oklahoma

vs. Baylor

For the first time since September 30, 1950, Texas wore White uniforms at home. These retro/throwback style uniforms were worn to commemorate the 50th anniversary of the 1970 National Championship Team.

at Oklahoma State

This was Texas' first road win over a Top 10 opponent since beating #5 Nebraska 20–13 in Lincoln on October 16, 2010.

vs. West Virginia

vs. Iowa State

at Kansas State

at Kansas

Due to Kansas's inability to meet minimum position requirements due to COVID-19, the game was postponed from November 21 to December 12, and was then canceled on December 10 because of a rise of COVID-19 cases in both programs.

vs. Colorado (Alamo Bowl)

Rankings

References

Texas
Texas Longhorns football seasons
Alamo Bowl champion seasons
Texas Longhorns football